Geng Zhongming (1604–1649) was a Chinese military general who lived through the transition from the Ming (1368–1644) to the Qing (1644–1912) dynasty, during which he served both sides. His grandson Geng Jingzhong was one of the Three Feudatories who rebelled against Qing rule in the 1670s.

Under Ming service
Geng Zhongming was described by historians as a tall and dark-complexioned man who was known for his bravery and resourcefulness. He had first served under Ming warlord Mao Wenlong near the border of Joseon Korea. When the latter was executed by Yuan Chonghuan in 1629 for insubordination, Geng and other military leaders like Kong Youde refused to serve Yuan. With their troops, they fled by boat from the Liaodong peninsula to Dengzhou in Shandong. There, Geng was hired by Shandong governor Sun Yuanhua and was allowed to join the Dengzhou garrison, where Sun was casting European-style cannon with the help of Portuguese soldiers. Sun gave Geng and Kong some training in the use of Portuguese artillery. In February 1632, Kong and Geng mutinied in Wuqiao, took over Dengzhou, and established a rebel regime in the city (Kong was named "king"), and tried to seize other towns in eastern Shandong, but they were eventually dislodged by a Ming relief force. In May 1633 they crossed the Bohai Gulf back to Liaodong and submitted to Hong Taiji (1592–1643), khan of the Jurchens and soon-to-be emperor of the Qing dynasty.

Under Qing service
Like Kong, Geng was allowed to retain control of his own troops (about 6,000 of them). In 1633 he helped Manchus capture the town of Lüshun, and in 1634 he accompanied a raiding expedition near Datong in Shanxi. In 1636 he was given the title of Prince Huaishun. He also led his troops into battle during the Qing's second invasion of Korea. In 1642 his soldiers were incorporated into the Han Plain Yellow Banner.

In April 1644, bandit leader Li Zicheng seized the Ming imperial capital Beijing and prodded the Chongzhen Emperor (r. 1627–1644) to commit suicide. Under the leadership of prince-regent Dorgon, the Qing pretexted to take revenge on Li to attack China. In late May 1644 Dorgon and his new ally Ming general Wu Sangui defeated Li at the Battle of Shanhai Pass and soon took Beijing from the hands of the rebel. Geng Zhongming was sent to accompany Prince Dodo in pursuit of Li, who was retreating to his former headquarters in Xi'an (Shanxi). After Li had been defeated, Geng took part in the Qing conquest of Jiangnan, then fought the troops of the Prince of Gui of the Southern Ming (1644–1662), a loyalist movement that was trying to reestablish the fallen Ming dynasty. When he returned to the capital in 1648, his nobility title was changed to "Prince who Pacifies the South" (靖南王 Jingnan wang).

Put in sole charge of a campaign to attack Guangdong, Geng had reached Jiangxi when he heard that he was being accused of protecting a subordinate who had harbored runaway slaves. He found three hundred slaves in his camp, sent them back to the capital in chains, and, without waiting for a verdict, committed suicide on 30 December 1649 in Ji'an, Jiangxi. His troops, now led by his son Geng Jimao (d. 1671), continued to fight the Southern Ming.

The "Dolo efu" 和碩額駙 rank was given to husbands of Qing princesses. Geng Zhongming, a Han bannerman, was awarded the title of Prince Jingnan, and his son Geng Jingmao managed to have both his sons Geng Jingzhong and Geng Zhaozhong 耿昭忠 become court attendants under the Shunzhi Emperor and marry Aisin Gioro women, with Prince Abatai's granddaughter marrying Geng Zhaozhong 耿昭忠 and Haoge's (a son of Hong Taiji) daughter marrying Geng Jingzhong. A daughter 和硕柔嘉公主 of the Manchu Aisin Gioro Prince Yolo 岳樂 (Prince An) was wedded to Geng Juzhong who was another son of Geng Jingmao.

References

Citations

Works cited 

 .
 
 . In two volumes.

1604 births
1649 deaths
Generals from Liaoning
Ming dynasty generals
People from Yingkou
Qing dynasty generals
Suicides in the Qing dynasty
Chinese princes